Petrolia (also Petrola, Petrolla) is a hamlet in the town of Scio in Allegany County, New York, United States.

References

Hamlets in New York (state)
Hamlets in Allegany County, New York